Dame Helen Anne Alexander DBE (10 February 1957 – 5 August 2017) was a British businesswoman. She served as the chairman of UBM plc. She had an MA from Oxford, an MBA from INSEAD and in 2016 was awarded the Legion d'Honneur.
She was Chancellor of the University of Southampton (2011–2017).

Early life
Alexander was born in Geneva to Bernard Alexander, a British lawyer who worked for the United Nations High Commissioner for Refugees, and Tania Benckendorff. Her mother was Russian (with roots in Estonia) and her maternal grandmother was Moura Budberg, adventuress, muse, and suspected double agent. Through her, Helen Alexander was related to Nick Clegg, sometime Deputy Prime Minister, whose paternal grandmother, Kira von Engelhardt, Baroness von Smolensk, was Budberg's niece.
 
Alexander was educated at St Paul's Girls' School in London. She earned a degree in geography from Hertford College, Oxford in 1978 and graduated from INSEAD in 1984.

Career
She began a career in publishing at Faber and Faber. She joined the Economist Group as a marketing executive in 1985. From 1997 to 2008 she was chief executive of the Economist Group, during which time profits greatly increased and the circulation of The Economist more than doubled. 

In 2004 she was appointed CBE for services to publishing. Alexander's numerous directorships included Huawei Technologies, Esure Group Holdings, Rolls-Royce Group, Incisive Media, Thomson-Reuters, UBM plc and Bain Capital. 

In 2011, she was the first female president of the Confederation of British Industry (CBI) and was appointed DBE for services to business. 

She was a trustee of Sir Tim Berners-Lee's World Wide Web Foundation, and was chairman of the Port of London Authority from January 2010 until 31 December 2015. Since September 2011 she had been Chancellor of the University of Southampton, the first woman in that role. Her appointment at Southampton attracted some criticism from the student body over Alexander's role at Rolls-Royce, given the company's role in the arms trade.

She was an honorary fellow of Hertford College, Oxford, and sat on the board of the Said Business School, University of Oxford.

Personal life
Alexander spoke fluent French. She was married and had three children. She was diagnosed with cancer in 2014 and died three years later.

References

1957 births
2017 deaths
Alumni of Hertford College, Oxford
British businesspeople
Dames Commander of the Order of the British Empire
Fellows of Hertford College, Oxford
INSEAD alumni
Recipients of the Legion of Honour
Chancellors of the University of Southampton
People educated at St Paul's Girls' School
British people of Estonian descent
British people of Russian descent
Deaths from cancer in England
Place of death missing